The Shire of Shepparton was a local government area in the Goulburn Valley region, about  north of Melbourne, the state capital of Victoria, Australia. From 1927 onwards, Shepparton itself was managed by a separate entity, ultimately known as the City of Shepparton.

History

Shepparton was once part of the vast Echuca Road District, which was formed in 1864 and became a shire in 1871, extended along the south bank of the Murray River, from Mount Hope Creek in the west, to the Ovens River in the east.

The Shire of Shepparton was incorporated on 30 May 1879. The southeastern section containing Shepparton itself split away on 18 April 1884, and was initially known as the Shire of South Shepparton. On 11 September 1885, the Shire of Shepparton was renamed Numurkah, and South Shepparton was renamed Shepparton on 2 July 1886. It increased its territory significantly when it gained part of the Devenish Riding of the Shire of Benalla on 23 December 1903, and part of the South Riding of the Shire of Euroa on 24 May 1911, which became the Dookie and Kialla Ridings respectively.

However, on 31 May 1927, the Shepparton Riding severed from the shire and became a borough, which became the City of Shepparton in 1949. Further transfers of land to the city occurred on 26 May 1948 and 1 October 1961.

On 18 November 1994, the Shire of Shepparton was abolished, and along with the City of Shepparton, the Shire of Rodney and some neighbouring districts, was merged into the newly created City of Greater Shepparton.

Wards

The Shire of Shepparton was divided into four ridings on 1 April 1990, each of which elected three councillors:
 Central Riding
 East Riding
 North Riding
 South Riding

Towns and localities
 Bunbartha
 Congupna
 Cosgrove
 Dookie
 Grahamvale
 Kialla
 Lemnos
 Orrvale
 Pine Lodge
 Shepparton East
 Tallygaroopna

Population

* Estimate in the 1958 Victorian Year Book.

References

External links
 Victorian Places - Shepparton Shire

Shepparton
Shepparton